In Ancient India, a shreni ( or  ,) was an association of traders, merchants, and artisans. Generally, a separate shreni existed for a particular group of persons engaged in the same vocation or activity. Shrenis have sometimes been compared with the guilds. However, persons engaged in hunting and fishing did not form any shreni.

Well-documented references to the existing of shreni have been found from 5th century BC, and texts mention the existence of shrenis and conversion of entire members of some shrenis to Buddhism or Jainism. Over a period of time, some shrenis became very wealthy with surplus resources, and acted as custodians and bankers of religious and other endowments. One of the widely referred shreni was of ivory carvers of Vidisha (in the modern Indian state of Madhya Pradesh). This shreni is accredited with sponsoring and financially supporting the construction of the southern gateway of the stupa at Sanchi, which is currently a World Heritage Site.

Some scholars have opined that as each economic activity and craft was having its specific traditions and trade secrets, shrenis were formed to protect the same, and fathers used to pass on the same to their sons, and so it continued from one generation to the next generation. Daughters were excluded from becoming the members of the shreni, as once married they went to their husbands’ homes, and were prone to divulge the trade secrets to the families of their husbands.

Shreni-dharma

Members were bound by guild-specific dharma. The Manusmriti stated "A king must inquire into the law of groups (jāti), of districts (ganapada), of guilds (shreni), and of families (kula)."

References

Dictionary of Hindu Lore and Legend by Anna Dhallapiccola

External links
 Agarwal, Ankit. (2012), "Development of Economic Organizations and their Role in Human Empowerment during the Gupta Period". History Today 13, New Delhi, .
 Sreni (Guilds): a Unique Social Innovation of Ancient India By Manikant Shah & D.P. Agrawal

Ancient India
Crafts
Labor history
Economic history of India